Thank You is a 2013 Malayalam drama thriller film written by Arunlal Ramachandran and directed by V. K. Prakash. The firm stars Jayasurya, Honey Rose and Sethu and is produced by Shahul Hameed Marikar. Thank You was produced under the banner of Marikar Films and features music composed by Bijibal. The film's cinematography was led by Arvind Krishna and edited by Babu Rathnam. Although the film earned back its revenue from satellite rights, it did not perform well in theaters.

Plot
The film is shown to be a reflection of the current socio-political system, based on the violence against women. It revolves around a person who arrives in Trivandrum city who takes a ride from place to place in an Autorickshaw. His name or whereabouts are not revealed, and he just travels from place to place in the auto rickshaw. The questions about his whereabouts form the rest of the story.

Cast
Jayasurya
Honey Rose as Remya 
Sethu as Dev Menon
Kailash as Shankar 
Abi 
Tini Tom as Sugunan
Jubil Rajan P Dev
Mukundan
Sudheer Karamana  
P. Balachandran as Balettan
Aishwarya Devan as Sruthi 
Mridul as Gopan
Saiju Kurup as Arun
Durga Premjith as saiju kurup daughter

Production

Development
The movie kicked off a series of films by the production firm Marikar Films that also includes the Mollywood debut of directors Gautham Vasudev Menon and Thiru. Thank You, which is penned by 10:30 am Local Call scribe Arun Lal, was the first among the eight films to go on floors. On the film, the scriptwriter had revealed before shoot that the film is a thriller that unravels in Trivandrum and the plot revolves around a person who comes to the city. Also that they do not introduce the person by his name or whereabouts, and he just travels from place to place in an auto rickshaw. The questions about his whereabouts form the rest of the story. Incidentally, the project took shape in just over two weeks. The scriptwriter discussed the idea with actor Jayasurya on the set of Mumbai Police and the actor had asked him to approach the director V. K. Prakash, who had been astonished over by the story and requested for a complete script as soon as possible to start work on the film. The project took shape really fast over a few days. Jayasurya told that "he thinks it's a gem of a script and Arun Lal's a master scriptwriter to come up with it in such a short time. Even VKP is thrilled about the movie."

Casting
Jayasurya was cast by the script writer as he was the first one of cast and crew which the script was told to. Honey Rose who had been in the directors previous film Trivandrum Lodge paired with Jayasurya was cast to do the role as a modern wife. Remya Nambeesan was also considered for a prominent role. Actor Sethu who played the role of police officer Bhaskar in the Tamil film Mynaa was cast to play the one of the lead role as the director was impressed with his performance. There was also rumours of Sunny Wayne at the time a rising actor to be part of the film. Tini Tom was also cast to play a police officer after being part of the director V. K. Prakash's 2011 film Beautiful. Other people announced as per cast were Kailash, Mukundan, Balachandran and Aishwarya Devan. The actress Aishwarya, who debuted in Tamil films with Yuvan, had now signed her next in prominent and one of her best roles. Aishwarya Devan plays a reporter in the film, a challenging role which is an emotional thriller.

Filming
The puja of Thank You and seven other films by Marikar Films was conducted on 9 April 2013. Principal photography began on 11 April 2013 at Trivandrum in the residential area Chackai.

References

External links
 
 MMDb

2013 films
2010s Malayalam-language films
Indian thriller drama films
Films shot in Thiruvananthapuram
2013 thriller drama films
Films directed by V. K. Prakash
2013 drama films